Sven Vilhelm Herman Fryksenius (born 24 June 1930) is a Swedish curler.

He is a 1966 Swedish men's curling champion.

In 1997 he was inducted into the Swedish Curling Hall of Fame.

He was employed as a dentist.

Teams

References

External links
 
  (look at "FRYKSENIUS, SVEN W H")

Living people
1930 births
Sportspeople from Stockholm
Swedish male curlers
Swedish curling champions
Swedish dentists